Abdelkader Bouhenia (born 7 May 1986) is a boxer from Carcassonne. He is best known for having won the Bronze medal in the light-heavyweight division at the 2009 World Amateur Boxing Championships in Milan.

Career

Bouhenia, who fights from an orthodox stance, beat Daugirdas Semiotas at the 2009 World Amateur Boxing Championships. He then scored a huge upset by defeating Irish southpaw, Kenneth Egan. Bouhenia later lost in the semifinals to another southpaw, Elshod Rasulov (4:8).

At the 2012 European Boxing Olympic he lost his second fight and didn't qualify.

References

 Amateur results (scroll down for years)

1986 births
Living people
People from Carcassonne
Light-heavyweight boxers
French male boxers
AIBA World Boxing Championships medalists
Sportspeople from Aude
Mediterranean Games silver medalists for France
Mediterranean Games medalists in boxing
Competitors at the 2013 Mediterranean Games